Jaimie Vokia is a Solomon Islands politician.

Political career 
He lost his seat of North East Guadalcanal constituency in 2020 after being found guilty of bribing voters. His wife Ethel won the by-election.

See also 
 11th Parliament of Solomon Islands

References 

Living people
21st-century politicians
Independent politicians of the Solomon Islands
Members of the National Parliament of the Solomon Islands
Year of birth missing (living people)